A paragraphos (from , 'beside', and , 'to write') was a mark in ancient Greek punctuation, marking a division in a text (as between speakers in a dialogue or drama) or drawing the reader's attention to another division mark, such as the two dot punctuation mark .

There are many variants of this symbol, sometimes supposed to have developed from Greek gamma, the first letter of the word . It was usually placed at the beginning of a line and trailing a little way under or over the text.

It was referenced by Aristotle, who was dismissive of its use.

Unicode encodes multiple versions:

See also
 Obelus and Obelism, Greek marginal notes
 Coronis, the Greek paragraph mark
 Pilcrow (¶), the English paragraph mark
 Section sign (§), the English section mark

References

Writing
Punctuation
Ancient Greek punctuation

pl:Paragraf